Lieutenant General Sir Anthony Arthur Denison-Smith,  (born 24 January 1942) is a former British Army officer who commanded the 1st (UK) Armoured Division.

Military career
Educated at Harrow School and the Royal Military Academy Sandhurst, Denison-Smith was commissioned into the Grenadier Guards in 1962. He was given command of the 2nd Battalion Grenadier Guards in 1981 during which time he was deployed in a peace-keeping role in Cyprus. He was appointed Chief of Staff for 4th Armoured Division in 1983, Commander of 22nd Armoured Brigade in 1985 and Chief of Staff for 1st British Corps in 1988. He went on to be Director General Doctrine and Training at the Ministry of Defence in 1990, General Officer Commanding 4th Armoured Division in 1991 and then General Officer Commanding 1st (UK) Armoured Division in 1993 when it was reformed from 4th Armoured Division. His last appointment was as General Officer Commanding Southern District in 1994 before he retired in 1996.

In retirement he became Lieutenant of the Tower of London.

Family
He is married to Julia and they have three sons.

References

|-

|-
 

1942 births
Living people
British Army lieutenant generals
Free Foresters cricketers
Deputy Lieutenants of Essex
Knights Commander of the Order of the British Empire
People educated at Harrow School
Graduates of the Royal Military Academy Sandhurst
Grenadier Guards officers